The 2001–02 Syracuse Orangemen basketball team represented Syracuse University in NCAA men's basketball competition in the 2001–02 Division I season. The head coach was Jim Boeheim, serving for his 26th year. The team played its home games at the Carrier Dome in Syracuse, New York.  The team finished with a 23–13 (9–7) record, while making it to the Final Four round of the NIT tournament. The team was led by senior Preston Shumpert and juniors Kueth Duany and DeShaun Williams. Seniors Billy Celuck, sophomores Jeremy McNeil and James Thues and freshmen Craig Forth and Josh Pace and Hakim Warrick were also major contributors.

Roster

Preston Shumpert (20.7 ppg, 6.1 rpg)
DeShaun Williams (15.9 ppg, 4.1 apg)
Kueth Duany (12.2 ppg, 5.3 rpg)
Hakim Warrick (6.1 ppg, 4.8 rpg)
James Thues (5.6 ppg, 2.9 rpg)
Craig Forth (4.9 ppg, 4.5 rpg)
Josh Pace (4.3 ppg, 2.0 rpg)
Jeremy McNeil (3.4 ppg, 3.7 rpg)
Billy Celuck (1.9, 2.0 rpg)

Developments

Syracuse defeated Wake Forest to capture the Preseason NIT Championship.
Although Syracuse was ranked as high as No. 7 at one point, Syracuse would lose 9-of-13 games, and would miss the NCAA Tournament for the first time since the 1996–97 season.
Syracuse advanced to the NIT Postseason Semifinals, where it lost to South Carolina.
Shumpert was named to the All-Big East First Team following the season.
Following the season, guards DeShaun Williams and James Thues both left the team. Williams transferred to Iona while Thues left for Detroit.

References

Syracuse Orange
Syracuse Orange men's basketball seasons
Syracuse Orange
Syracuse Orangemen basketball
Syracuse Orangemen basketball